Lower Wilmot is a rural locality in the local government area (LGA) of Kentish in the North-west and west LGA region of Tasmania. The 2016 census recorded a population of 115 for the state suburb of Lower Wilmot.

History 
Lower Wilmot was gazetted as a locality in 1965.

Geography
The Forth River forms the eastern boundary. The Wilmot River, a tributary of the Forth, forms the western and northern boundaries, joining the Forth at the north-east corner.

Road infrastructure 
Route C132 (Wilmot Road) runs through from north to south.

References

Towns in Tasmania
Localities of Kentish Council